Elachista triseriatella is a moth of the family Elachistidae. It is found from Great Britain, Denmark and Latvia to Spain and Italy.

The forewings are white with three rows of black scales on the disc. The hindwings are grey. Adults are on wing from June to July.

The larvae feed on Festuca longifolia and Festuca ovina. They mine the leaves of their host plant. They are light yellow with a light brown head. Larvae can be found from autumn to the end of May.

References

triseriatella
Leaf miners
Moths described in 1854
Moths of Europe
Taxa named by Henry Tibbats Stainton